Snoozebox is a pop-up hotel company which used modified recycled shipping containers.

History 

It was founded by leisure entrepreneur Robert Breare in 2011, with former Formula 1 racing driver David Coulthard as a principle. 

The portable hotels are found at many motorsports events and also at the 2013 Edinburgh Festival Fringe and at Thorpe Park's Crash Pad hotel. It reported a pretax loss of £2.3 million for the six months to June 30, less than the £5.1 million loss it reported in the first half of 2013.

The company has formed a partnership with Medirest to test the patient hotel model at Shrewsbury and Telford Hospital NHS Trust.

The contractor Bilfinger Salamis had planned a modular hotel, using Snoozebox's shipping containers, which would have 80 ensuite bedrooms for its skills and safety training centre in Aberdeen. The hotel was planned to be open for 5 years.

A 58-room youth hostel, a partnership between the Eden Project and the Youth Hostel Association has been built entirely of shipping containers by the company in St Austell.

The company entered administration in 2017.

See also 
 Pop-up hotel

References

External links
 Snoozebox

Companies based in Hampshire
Hotel chains in the United Kingdom
Portable buildings and shelters
Companies established in 2011